Tengah MRT station is a future elevated Mass Rapid Transit (MRT) station on the Jurong Region line in Tengah, Singapore.

It will be the northern terminus of the East Branch of the Jurong Region line, allowing passengers on the East Branch to change trains for Main Branch train services. Trains entering service at this station will terminate at Pandan Reservoir.

History
On 9 May 2018, LTA announced that Tengah station would be part of the proposed Jurong Region line (JRL). The station will be constructed as part of Phase 1, JRL (West), consisting of 10 stations between Choa Chu Kang, Boon Lay and Tawas, and is expected to be completed in 2027.

Contract J102 for the design and construction of Tengah Station and associated viaducts was awarded to Shanghai Tunnel Engineering Co. (Singapore) Pte Ltd at a sum of S$465.2 million. Construction will start in 2020, with completion in 2027. Contract J102 also includes the design and construction of Choa Chu Kang station and Choa Chu Kang West station, and associated viaducts and A&A works to the existing Choa Chu Kang station complex.

Initially expected to open in 2026, the restrictions on the construction due to the COVID-19 pandemic has led to delays in the JRL line completion, and the date was pushed to 2027.

Location
The station will be located within the future Tengah planning area.

References

Mass Rapid Transit (Singapore) stations
Proposed railway stations in Singapore
Railway stations scheduled to open in 2027